San Domenico House is a boutique hotel in London, England. It is a small hotel with just 19 rooms, located just off Kings Road at 29-31 Draycott Place in Chelsea. It was previously known as the Sloane Hotel, until 2006, when it was situated at number 29. The hotel is part of the San Domenico Hotels group, owned by Aldo Melpignano, and is a sister hotel to the Borgo Egnazia.

Architecture and furnishings
The exterior of the hotel is red stone,  consisting of two converted Victorian townhouses, with a facade of that era. The lobby is marbled. Neo-classical Italian  furnishings are abundant throughout the hotel. It has 19 rooms and suites, which feature a range of antique furniture, tapestries and 19th century European art, including Royal portraits. The reception room of the hotel features a cabinet which displays items such as military medals and evening bags. The drawing room, adjacent to the reception room, has a range of antique furniture from an ormolu chest of drawers and walnut tallboy, to Empire-era clocks and vases.  Fiona Duncan of The Daily Telegraph highlights the "pretty breakfast room, with its gold chair cushions, lace tablecloths and paintings of flowers and fruit on patterned wallpaper".

Each of the bedrooms are air-conditioned, with seating areas and flat-screen TVs. The bathrooms feature Penhaligon's toiletries and bathrobes. The Suites are large bedrooms, measuring 35-45 square meters, with particularly high ceilings. Six of the bedrooms are known as "gallery rooms", which contain mezzanine sitting areas and silk-canopied four-poster beds, though the rooms are each unique with a range of different themes and designs from notable designers. Sarah Barrell of The Independent describes Gallery suite 104 as the "brown" room, furnished with "biscuit brown furry throws, dotted with chocolate cushions, heavy brocade curtains". The Deluxe rooms, measuring 30 square feet, are typically furnished with rare Italian artwork, and the original commodes and mirrors from the 19th century. Duncan notes that several of these older rooms "mix Signora Melpignano’s singular style with antiques and pictures inherited from the Sloane Hotel" but states that the newer rooms are purely Italianate. The Superior Double rooms measure 27 square feet, each with a unique design and an abundance of world antiques.

Services
Even though San Domenico House does not have its own restaurant, it provides a room service and breakfast. Each room contains a refrigerated minibar, with non-alcoholic drinks, though alcoholic beverages can be ordered from the room service menu. The two double suites on the top floor are intended for large families, and are complemented with a children's menu and games and babysitting services which can be requested.

References

Bibliography

External links
 

Chelsea, London
Hotels in London
Buildings and structures in the Royal Borough of Kensington and Chelsea